This is a list of defunct airlines of Eswatini.

See also
 List of airlines of Eswatini
 List of airports in Eswatini

References

Eswatini
Airlines
Airlines, defunct